The Transfer Orbit Stage (TOS) was an upper stage developed by Martin Marietta for Orbital Sciences Corporation during the late 1980s and early 1990s.  The TOS was designed to be a lower-cost alternative to Inertial Upper Stage and Centaur G upper stages. The TOS was designed to be deployed by the Titan 34D, Commercial Titan III and Space Shuttle.

The main propulsion system of the Transfer Orbit Stage was an Orbus 21 solid rocket motor. Attitude control was provided by hydrazine thrusters. The inertial guidance system used a ring laser gyroscope produced by Honeywell. Its control system employed a digital optimal, time-scheduled control algorithm to provide stability whilst the Orbus 21 was burning, while a phase-plane controller was used to manage its reaction-control system.

Only two Transfer Orbit Stages were launched. The first was launched on 25 September 1992, aboard a Commercial Titan III with the Mars Observer spacecraft bound for Mars. Despite a successful launch, the Mars Observer spacecraft later malfunctioned. This was also successful.

The Transfer Orbit Stage was designed to separate from the Space Shuttle via pyrotechnic devices enclosed in a frangible metal joint known as a Super*Zip. On STS-51, the primary and backup pyrotechnic devices inside the Super*Zip were erroneously fired simultaneously, resulting in minor damage to both the TOS, and the Shuttle's payload bay lining. However, the ACTS satellite deployed successfully and functioned normally on orbit. The Shuttle landed safely despite the anomaly.

References

Rocket stages